The River Kelvin (Scottish Gaelic: Abhainn Cheilbhinn) is a tributary of the River Clyde in northern and northeastern Glasgow, Scotland. It rises on the moor south east of the village of Banton, east of Kilsyth.

The University of Glasgow is situated by the river, in Gilmorehill. In 1892, the title of Baron Kelvin was created for physicist and engineer William Thomson, a professor at the university. The name "kelvin" for the unit of temperature, chosen in honour of Lord Kelvin, thus traces its origins to the river.

Etymology 
The hydronym Kelvin is probably of Brittonic origin. It may involve *celeμïn, of which the Welsh cognate celefyn means "stem, stalk", or else the zero-grade of the Indo European root of that element *kl̥h1-, "rise up".

Confluence
The river's first important (and considerably larger) confluence is with the Chantyclear Burn which originates from the ridge of Dullatur. It then continues its westward flow being joined by the often depleted (due to water being diverted to the canal) Shawend Burn to the west of Craigmarloch bridge. The next important tributary is the Garrel at a point south-east of Kilsyth south of Dumbreck Marsh. The Kelvin then passes through the large flood plain north of Twechar where it is fed by the Dock Water, Queenzie Burn, the Cast Burn and the Board Burn before reaching Kirkintilloch at its confluence with the more substantial waters of the Glazert and Luggie. It then flows past Torrance, meanders through Balmore Haughs, to the south of Bardowie where it joins the Allander Water, after which it takes a south-westerly direction towards Maryhill, Hillhead, through Kelvingrove Park before falling into the River Clyde at Yorkhill Basin in the city of Glasgow.

Fauna
Wildlife along Strathkelvin include the grey squirrel, magpie, grey heron, dipper, cormorant, blue tit, great tit, chaffinch, common snipe, great spotted woodpecker, blackbird, redwing, carrion crow, kingfisher, mallard, goosander, roe deer, red fox, otter, water vole, American mink and brown rat.

Successive attempts at improving the quality of the water have been rewarded by the return of salmon. The river has always been home to brown trout and both species can be fished by obtaining the relevant permits.

Bridges over the Kelvin

The Kelvin is bridged at several points throughout Glasgow. Most notable is the Great Western Bridge on Great Western Road in the city's West End. Below this bridge is an underground station that bears the name Kelvinbridge, a name commonly attached to the area. Other bridges include the one near the Antonine Wall at Balmuildy, Partick Bridge on Dumbarton Road, the bridge at Queen Margaret Drive, Ha'penny Bridge and several in the grounds of Kelvingrove Park.

The Kelvin Aqueduct carries the Forth and Clyde Canal over the river. It was Britain's largest when it was opened. The river is used as an overflow for the canal.

See also 

 Allander Water, Allander Burn
 Kelvinhead
 List of places in East Dunbartonshire
 List of places in Scotland

References

History of Banton; William Gracie, 1995 pub. Stratkelvin district council. (Kilsyth Library, local studies)

External links
Friends of the River Kelvin River Kelvin based charity
River Kelvin Angling Association River Kelvin Angling Association
Kelvin Walkway - Glasgow West End Illustrated guide to riverside walk
Kelvin Bridges Heritage Trail by ''Institute of Civil Engineers Scotland

Rivers of Glasgow
River Clyde
Partick
Kirkintilloch
Bearsden
Maryhill